Wang Mengli (born July 28, 1989 in China) is a female Chinese table tennis player. She has played for Fenerbahçe TT since 2009 and also played for Lu Neng China in China.

References

External links
Player profile on fenerbahce.org
Team page on fenerbahce.org

1989 births
Living people
Chinese female table tennis players
Fenerbahçe table tennis players